Reaching into Infinity is the seventh studio album by British power metal band DragonForce, released on 19 May 2017. It is the band's first studio album to feature drummer Gee Anzalone and the last to feature longtime keyboardist Vadim Pruzhanov.

A music video for "Ashes of the Dawn" was released on 15 May 2017, and a music video for "Midnight Madness" was released on 20 September 2017. Pruzhanov was not featured in either of these videos, nor in any of the shows that the band performed during and after the recording of the album. In a video published on his official YouTube channel, he explained that he wanted to have more time for his daughter and that due to contractual obligations, he had to choose between performing in all or none of the shows; as a result, he was absent from the album's promotional tour, and he eventually left the band in May 2018.

Songwriting and concept 
The album was written largely by Sam Totman and Frédéric Leclercq, with Vadim Pruzhanov contributing to one song and Marc Hudson contributing to some of the lyrics.

Leclercq stated he listens more to traditional heavy metal, thrash metal, death metal, black metal and progressive metal than he listens to power metal, which is why the album sounds different from the band's previous efforts. When asked about Leclercq's songwriting work and the possible influence of his extreme metal side project Sinsaenum, Herman Li stated, "We try to make use of everyone's skills, which is something we didn’t do much at the beginning of the band. I don't think Sinsaenum made too much of a difference, because there are still so many ideas we haven't been able to put into Dragonforce yet, and if you introduce too many new ideas you lose focus. [...]" The band at first wanted to have a guest for the harsh vocals, but they eventually had Hudson give it a try and they were happy with the result.

Li described the album as their "most diverse" one and also as "escapist", saying people are supposed to listen to it to temporarily get away from the "craziness of the world". The album title was conceived to be a reference to how the band wish their music to take people from anywhere to any time.

Reaching into Infinity is the band's longest studio album at 60:46. The album also features the band's longest song, at 11 minutes and 3 seconds, in "The Edge of the World". When asked about the inspiration for writing that song, Totman explained they had the idea from the title track of Iron Maiden's Seventh Son of a Seventh Son. Hudson said that the song centres around the poem Epic of Gilgamesh. Li also explained that "Silence" was written about a friend of Leclercq who committed suicide.

Album cover 
Li explained that the portal in the middle of the album's cover is a wormhole, symbolizing the energy of the band's music and the idea that people from anywhere in the world can reach different times through it, emphasising the album's escapist vibe. He also explained that the dragon in the cover represented the band's spirit.

Recording 
The album was recorded at a number of locations, including Fascination Street Studios, in Sweden; Lamerluser Studios, in London, United Kingdom; Dark Lane Studios, in Witney, United Kingdom; Evil1 Studios, in Charleville-Mézières, France; and Shredforce One Studios, in California, United States. Instead of reserving some time to work exclusively on the album from beginning to end, the band intercalated studio commitments with their touring legs. Leclercq commented:

Track listing

The special edition of the album also included a bonus DVD containing footage of the band's performance at Woodstock Festival Poland in 2016, available in a single angle and four camera multi-angles. It was also distributed individually in digital stores.

Personnel
Credits adapted from the band's website.

Band members
 Marc Hudson – lead and backing vocals
 Sam Totman – guitars, backing vocals
 Herman Li – guitars, backing vocals
 Frédéric Leclercq – bass, guitars, backing vocals, guitar solo on "The Edge of the World" and "Our Final Stand"
 Vadim Pruzhanov – keyboards, backing vocals
 Gee Anzalone – drums, backing vocals

Additional musicians
 Clive Nolan – backing vocals
 Emily Ovenden – backing vocals
 Dagge Hagelin – battle choirs
 Ronny Milianowicz – battle choirs
 André Alvinzi – additional keyboards and programming
 Ronny Milianowicz – marching snare drum on "Reaching into Infinity"
 Francesco Paoli and Francesco Ferrini (MIDAS Productions) and Jon Phipps – orchestration

Technical staff
 Jens Bogren – production, mixing on all regular edition tracks
 Johan Örnborg – mixing on special edition bonus tracks
 Tony Lindgren – mastering
 Linus Corneliusson – edition, mixing assistance
 Viktor Stenquist – additional engineering
 Ludwig Näsvall – studio drum technician

Charts

References

2017 albums
DragonForce albums
Metal Blade Records albums
Albums produced by Jens Bogren